is a railway station in Nada-ku, Kobe, Hyōgo Prefecture, Japan.

Overview
The station has two elevated side platforms serving two tracks.

Layout

Surroundings 
Route 2 (国道2号) - Arterial route from Osaka to Fukuoka
Nada Ward Kobe City Office (灘区役所)
Kobe Rokko Bowl

Buses

Kobe City Bus 

Hanshin Bus 
"Nada Kuyakusho Mae" stop for Hanshin Nishinomiya (阪神西宮) and Kobe Zeikan Mae (神戸税関前)

History 
Shinzaike Station opened on the Hanshin Main Line on 12 April 1905 under a different name (Tōmyō station). It was renamed to its current name in 1930.

Service was suspended owing to the Great Hanshin earthquake in January 1995. Restoration work on the Hanshin Main Line took 7 months to complete.

Station numbering was introduced on 21 December 2013, with Shinzaike being designated as station number HS-27.

Gallery

References

External links 

 Station website (in Japanese)

Railway stations in Japan opened in 1905
Railway stations in Hyōgo Prefecture